Yamilson Alexis Rivera Hurtado (born June 18, 1989), known as Yamilson Rivera, is a professional Colombian footballer who currently plays for Envigado.

External links
 
 

Living people
1989 births
Colombian footballers
Colombian expatriate footballers
Categoría Primera A players
Categoría Primera B players
Liga MX players
Ascenso MX players
Cúcuta Deportivo footballers
América de Cali footballers
Mineros de Zacatecas players
Independiente Santa Fe footballers
Unión Magdalena footballers
Deportivo Pasto footballers
Club León footballers
Real Cartagena footballers
Envigado F.C. players
People from Tumaco
Colombian expatriate sportspeople in Mexico
Expatriate footballers in Mexico
Association football midfielders
Sportspeople from Nariño Department